The following is a timeline of the history of Lowell, Massachusetts, US.

19th century
 1822
Merrimack Manufacturing Company incorporated.
Hugh Cummiskley leads 30 Irishmen up the Middlesex Canal starting in Charlestown, Mass to Pawtucket falls in Chelmsford, Ma
 1824
 St. Anne's Church organized.
 Lowell Daily Journal and Courier begins publication.
 1825 - Middlesex Mechanic Association, Hamilton Manufacturing Company,and Mechanic Phalanx established.
 1826
 Town of Lowell established from Chelmsford land.
 First Baptist Church and First Universalist Church organized.
 Merrimack Journal newspaper in publication.
 Central Bridge opens.
 1827 - First Methodist Episcopal Church organized.
 1828 - Appleton Company, Lowell Bank, and Lowell Manufacturing Company incorporated.
 1829
 Lowell Institution for Savings incorporated.
 Lowell Fire Department established.
 1830
 Lawrence Manufacturing Company, Middlesex Company, Suffolk Manufacturing Company, and Tremont Mills incorporated.
 Appleton Street Church, South Congregational Church, and Worthen Street Baptist Church established.
 Town Hall built.
 Population: 6,474.
 1831
 First Roman Catholic Church organized.
 Railroad Bank incorporated.
 1832 - Lowell Bleachery incorporated.
 1833 - Police Court established.
 1834
 Women's labor strike.
 First Freewill Baptist Church organized.
 Lowell Advertiser and Lowell Patriot newspapers begin publication.
 Lowell Circulating Library in business.
 James Abbott McNeill Whistler, painter born.
 1835
 Boston and Lowell Railroad begins operating.
 Boott Cotton Mills incorporated.
 Lucy Larcom, teacher, poet and author moves to Lowell.
 1836
 City of Lowell incorporated.
 Factory Girls' Association, Dispensary, Lowell Temperance Society, and Second Universalist Parish established.
 1838
 Nashua and Lowell Railroad begins operating.
 County jail built.
 1839
 Massachusetts Cotton Mills incorporated.
 Middlesex Horticultural Society and Lowell Medical Association founded.
 1840
 Hospital Association and Lowell Museum established.
 Lowell Offering begins publication.
 By now, Lowell mills had recruited over 8,000 Lowell mill girls.
 Population: 20,796.
 1841
 Lowell Cemetery established.
 Vox Populi newspaper begins publication.
 1842 - Charles Dickens visits Lowell.
 1843 - First Wesleyan Methodist Churchand Missionary Association established.
 1844 - City Library, Lowell Female Labor Reform Association, and New Jerusalem Swedenborgian Church established.
 1845 - Lowell Machine Shop incorporated.
 1846
 Lowell and Lawrence Railroad incorporated.
 Jefferson Bancroft becomes mayor.
 1847 - June: U.S. president Polk visits Lowell.
 1848 - Francis floodgate and Colburn School built.
 1850
 Lowell Gas Light Company in business.
 Salem and Lowell Railroad begins operating.
 Middlesex County Law Library founded.
 Court-House built.
 Population: 33,383.
 1851 - Lowell Daily Citizen newspaper begins publication.
 1852 - May: Lajos Kossuth visits Lowell.
 1853
 Belvidere Woollen Manufacturing Company organized.
 St. Patrick's Church and Merrimack Street Depot built.
 1856 - Jail built.
 1857 - Varnum School built.
 1863 - High School Association organized.
 1864 - Lowell Horse Railroad begins operating.
 1865
 United States Bunting Company in business.
 Wamesit Power Company incorporated.
 1867 - St. John's Hospital and Young Men's Christian Association established.
 1868 - Old Franklin Literary Association and Old Residents' Historical Association organized.
 1870 - Coggeshall's Circulating Library in business.
 1873 - Young Women's Home established.
 1875 - Riding Park, and Club Dramatique established.
 1876
 Moxie beverage invented.
 Lowell Art Association founded.
 1882 - Butler School built.
 1883
 Public Library opens.
 Yorick Club active.
 1887 - Board of Trade established.
 1889 - Opera House built.
 1890 - Population: 77,696.
 1891 - Lowell General Hospital founded.
 1893 - Lowell Post Office built.
 1894 - Normal School and Middlesex Women's Club founded.
 1895 - Middlesex Village School built.
 1897 - Lowell Textile School opens.
 1898 - Pawtucket Congregational Church built.
 1900
 Gaity Theatre opens.
 Population: 94,969.

20th century

 1902 - Lowell Historical Society incorporated.
 1905 - Tewksbury's Wigginville neighborhood annexed to the City of Lowell.
 1908 - Holy Trinity Greek Orthodox Church built.
 1909 - Lowell's Merrimack Valley Course hosted a motor racing festival that featured four AAA-sanctioned championship car races.
 1910 - Population: 106,294.
 1911 - Colonial Theatre opens.
 1917 - Demoulas Market (grocery) in business.
 1918 - International Institute active.
 1922 - Lowell Memorial Auditorium built.
 1924 - Commodore Ballroom opens.
 1925 - Edith Nourse Rogers becomes U.S. representative for Massachusetts's 5th congressional district.
 1927 - Victory Theater opens.
 1930 - Post Office built.
 1937 - Cawley Memorial Stadium built.
 1942 - Lowell Ordnance Plant active.
 1946 - New England Golden Gloves boxing tournament begins.
 1951
 WCAP (AM) radio begins broadcasting.
 Monarch Diner in business.
 1970 - Lowell Community Health Center established.
 1971 - Lowell Historic District Commission proposed by City Councilor M. Brendan Fleming approved by the Lowell City Council
 1974 - Lowell Regional Transit Authority created.
 1975
 University of Massachusetts Lowell established.
 Paul Tsongas becomes U.S. representative for Massachusetts's 5th congressional district.
 1976 - Wang Laboratories relocates to Lowell.
 1978
 Lowell National Historical Park established.
 Yorick Club goes bankrupt.
 1979
 B. Joseph Tully becomes city manager.
 Merrimack Regional Theatre active.
 1980
 Wang headquarters construction begins.
 Population: 92,418.
 1983 - Lowell Historic Board and Downtown Lowell Historic District established.
 1987
 Middlesex Community College opens campus in Lowell.
 New England Quilt Museum founded.
 1989
 Glory Buddhist Temple established.
 Sister city relationship established with Saint-Dié-des-Vosges, France.
 1990
 Lowell Folk Festival begins.
 Baystate Marathon begins.
 1991
 Richard Johnson becomes city manager.
 University of Massachusetts' Industrial History Center established.
 1992 - August: Wang goes bankrupt.
 1995
 Brian J. Martin becomes city manager.
 Chamber of Commerce formed.
 1996
 Lowell Spinners baseball team founded.
 Stoklosa Alumni Field opens.
 1997
 Showcase Cinema in business.
 Merrimack Valley Textile Museum relocated to Lowell.
 1998
 Edward A. LeLacheur Park and Paul E. Tsongas Center at UMass Lowell open.
 Lowell Lock Monsters hockey team formed.
 City website online (approximate date).

21st century

 2000
 John Cox becomes city manager.
 String Project (music education) established.
 2001
 Cultural Organization of Lowell established.
 Winterfest begins.
 Sister city relationships established with Phnom Penh and Siem Reap, Cambodia.
 2006
 Bernard Lynch becomes city manager.
 Shree Swaminarayan Temple established.
 Sister city relationship established with Bryansk, Russia.
 2007 - Niki Tsongas becomes U.S. representative for Massachusetts's 5th congressional district.
 2010
 Patrick O. Murphy becomes mayor.
 Sister city relationship established with Winneba, Ghana.
 Population: 106,519.
 2014
 July: Fire.
 Kevin Murphy becomes city manager.

See also
 History of Lowell, Massachusetts
 List of mayors and city managers of Lowell, Massachusetts
 National Register of Historic Places listings in Lowell, Massachusetts
 Timelines of other municipalities in Middlesex County, Massachusetts: Cambridge, Somerville, Waltham

References

Bibliography

Published in the 19th century
 
 
 
 
 
 
 
 
 
 
 
 
 
 
 
 
 
 
 
 
 
 
 
 
 

Published in the 20th century
 
 
 
 
 
 
 
 
 
 
  (fulltext via Open Library)

Published in the 21st century

External links

 
 Items related to Lowell, Mass., various dates (via Digital Commonwealth)
 Items related to Lowell, Mass., various dates (via US Library of Congress, Prints & Photos Division)
 University of Massachusetts Lowell. Center for Lowell History
 Items related to Lowell, Massachusetts, various dates (via Digital Public Library of America).

Images

History of Lowell, Massachusetts
Lowell